The 1979–80 Scottish League Cup final was played on 8 December 1979 and replayed on 12 December 1979. It was the final of the 34th Scottish League Cup competition, and it was a New Firm derby contested by Dundee United and Aberdeen. The first match ended in a goalless draw, but Dundee United won the replay 3–0 thanks to goals by Willie Pettigrew (2) and Paul Sturrock.

United's victory earned them a place in the 1980–81 UEFA Cup competition.

Match details

Dundee United were delayed arriving at Hampden due to heavy traffic and flooding, and reached the stadium just 30 minutes before kick-off. Although both teams created chances, it was the two sides' defences that dominated the match. United's manager Jim McLean felt his side had not played at their best, but that Aberdeen had, and that gave him confidence for the replay.

Replay 

The replay in windy conditions at Dens Park saw a larger attendance than the original tie. This time Dundee United dominated the match to win 3-0 and secure their first ever major honour.

References

External links 
 Soccerbase

1979 12
League Cup Final
Scottish League Cup Final 1979 12
Scottish League Cup Final 1979 12
1970s in Glasgow
20th century in Dundee
Sports competitions in Dundee
Sports competitions in Glasgow
Scottish League Cup
Football in Dundee
Football in Glasgow